Reith is a Scottish surname, and may refer to:

 John Reith (general)
 John Reith, 1st Baron Reith, Scottish broadcasting executive (Lord Reith of the BBC)
 Peter Reith, Australian politician

Origin
The origin of this Scottish surname is uncertain. However, there are explanations as to its origin:
 It may be an anglicized and reduced form of Mac Raith, meaning 'son of grace' (see McRae).
 Another possibility is that it is a habitational name and comes from a Cumbric or Pictish cognate of Welsh rhyd, meaning 'ford'. 
 A less likely explanation is that it denoted somebody originally from Reeth, Northern England. 
 It could, at least in some cases, be a variation of Reid.

In North America, this surname has absorbed several like-sounding surnames.

See also
 
 Baron Reith 
 Reith (Magna Carta)
 Wreath